Marcelle Marguerite Suzanne Tinayre (8 October 1870 in Tulle, Corrèze – 23 August 1948 in Grossouvre, Cher) was a French woman of letters and prolific author. She was educated at Bordeaux and Paris, and in 1889 married the painter Julien Tinayre.

Bibliography
 Avant l'amour, Paris, Calmann-Lévy, 1909
 Chateau en Limousin, Paris, L'Illustration, 1934
 Châteaux disparus, Paris, Formin-Didot, 1940
 Est-ce un miracle?, Paris, Flammarion 1939
 Figures dans la nuit, Paris, Calmann-Lévy, 1926
 Fille des pierres, Paris, Hamy, 1990
 Gérard et Delphine [I]: La porte rouge, Paris, Flammarion, 1936
 Gérard et Delphine [II]: Le rendez-vous du soir, Paris, Flammarion, 1938
 Hellé, Paris, Calmann-Lévy, 1898
 Histoire de l'amour, Paris, Flammarion, 1935
 La consolatrice, Paris, L'Illustration, 1907–1908
 La douceur de vivre, Paris, [s.n.], 1910
 La femme et son secret, Paris, Flammarion, 1933
 La légende de Duccio et d'Orsette, Paris, l'Illustration, 1923
 La maison, du péché, Paris, Calmann-Lévy, 1900
 La rançon, Paris, Nelson, 1894
 La rebelle, Paris, Calmann-Lévy, 1921
 La veillée des armes. Le départ: août 1914, Paris, Calmann-Lévy, 1915
 La vie amoureuse de Francois Barbazanges, Paris, Calmann-Lévy, 1903
 La vie amoureuse de Madame de Pompadour, Paris, Flammarion, 1924
 L'amour qui pleure, Paris, Calmann-Lévy, 1908
 Le bouclier d'Alexandre, Paris, L’Illustration, 1922
 Le livre proscrit; scènes de la révolution communiste en Hongrie, Paris, Plon 1925
 L'ennemie intime, Paris, L’Illustration, 1931
 L'oiseau d'orage, Paris, Calmann Lévy, 1894
 L'ombre de l'amour, Paris, Calmann-Lévy, 1909
 Madame de Pompadour, Paris, Flammarion, 1924
 Mademoiselle Justine de Liron, Paris, Bossard, 1921
 Notes d'une voyageuse en Turquie : jours de bataille et de révolution ; choses et gens de province ; premiers jours d'un nouveau règne ; la vie au harem, Paris, Calmann-Lévy, 1909
 Perséphone, Paris, Calmann-Lévy, 1920
 Priscille Séverac, Paris, Calmann-Lévy, 1922
 Saint Jean libérateur, Paris, l'Illustration, 1926
 Sainte Marie du feu, Paris, L'Illustration, 1938
 Terres étrangères : Norvège, Suède, Hollande, Andalousie, Paris, Flammarion, 1928
 Un drame de famille, Paris, Calmann-Lévy, 1925
 Une provinciale en 1830, Paris, Lafitte, 1927

Notes

References

External links
 

1870 births
1948 deaths
People from Tulle
19th-century French novelists
20th-century French novelists
Légion d'honneur refusals